Mr. Broadway is a 1933 American pre-Code comedy film written by Abel Green and Ed Sullivan. The film was directed by Johnnie Walker (1894–1949) who was also a silent film actor and producer, and stars Sullivan along with a cast of celebrity walk-ons. It was shot in New York City.

Plot

The plot involves a newspaper reporter (Ed Sullivan, aka "Mr. Broadway") gathering material for his column. The plot was patterned on a similar film by columnist Walter Winchell, Broadway Through a Keyhole (1933). The Sullivan film primarily serves as a vehicle for him to escort viewers to various trendy New York nightclubs to watch celebrities.

Cast
 Ed Sullivan as himself
 Jack Benny as himself
 Jack Dempsey as himself
 Eddy Duchin as himself
 Ruth Etting as herself
 Lita Grey as herself
 Jack Haley as himself
 Isham Jones as himself
 Bert Lahr as himself
 Mary Livingstone as herself
 Ernst Lubitsch as himself
 Lupe Vélez as herself
 Dita Parlo as The Girl
 William Desmond as Suitor
 Tom Moore as Other Suitor

The section of the film with Parlo, Desmond, and Moore is taken from an uncompleted film by Edgar G. Ulmer, titled Love's Interlude or The Warning Shadow, and begun in 1932 at Peerless Productions.

References

External links

1933 films
1933 comedy films
American black-and-white films
American comedy films
1930s American films